This is a list of destinations served by Jazz Aviation. For mainline Air Canada destinations, see Air Canada.

Air Canada Express destinations

Canada

United States

Terminated destinations

See also
 List of Air Canada destinations

References

External links 
 
 Air Canada's Route Map

Air Canada
Lists of airline destinations